Abdullah Al-Kaisar (born 7 April 1973) is a Bangladesh Awami League politician and the former Member of Parliament of Narayanganj-3.

Early life
Abdullah Al-Kaisar was born on 7 April 1973 to a Bengali Muslim political family in Sonargaon, Narayanganj District. His father, Abul Hasnat, was the president of the Awami League's Sonargaon branch. His mother, Mamtaz Begum, was female correspondent of the Sonargaon Awami League. He has a B.S.S degree.

Career
Kaisar was elected to parliament from Narayanganj-3 as a Bangladesh Awami League candidate in 2008.

References

Awami League politicians
Living people
8th Jatiya Sangsad members
1973 births
People from Sonargaon Upazila